The Landesliga Bayern sits at step 6 of the German football league system and is the third highest level in the Bavarian football league system, below the Bayernliga and organised in five regional divisions. The current Landesligas were formed in 1963, when the Bundesliga was established. From 2012, when the Regionalliga Bayern was established, the Landesligas were expanded from three to five divisions.

Previous to that, from 1945 to 1950, the Landesliga Bayern existed as a tier-two league below the Oberliga Süd.

Overview

Landesliga Bayern 1945 to 1950
From 1945 to 1950, the Bayernliga was called Landesliga Bayern. It was then the second tier of Southern German Football.

The league was established after the Second World War, consisting of nine clubs, with the league winner promoted to the Oberliga Süd. After its first season, 1945–46, it expanded to two divisions, north and south, with eleven clubs each. At the end of season, the two league champions played for the Bavarian title and Oberliga promotion. In 1947–48, each division had 13 clubs.

In its last two seasons, 1948–49 and 1949–50, the league returned to a single division format. In 1948–49, it consisted of 16 clubs with the top two teams earning promotion. In 1949–50, 14 clubs were in the league and the best five teams earned entry to the newly formed 2. Oberliga Süd, which became the second tier in Southern Germany. The remaining nine clubs plus seven promoted teams formed the new Amateurliga Bayern, now the third tier.

Alongside the Landesliga Bayern, four other regional Landesligas existed as the second tier below the Oberliga Süd, these being:
 Landesliga Hessen
 Landesliga Nordbaden
 Landesliga Südbaden
 Landesliga Württemberg

Landesligas from 1963 to 2012

After the inception of the three Landesligas in 1963 the winners of these leagues were automatically promoted to the Bayernliga. The runners-up faced a relegation play-off with the team of the Bayernliga that is placed just above the relegation zone, usually the 15th placed team unless the league held more or less than the desired number of 18 teams, for a final promotion spot. Since the start of the promotion play-offs in 1981, Landesliga Süd had won the extra spot 17 times, Landesliga Mitte 8 times and Landesliga Nord only 5 times. In 1985, 1994, 1996 and 2003 additional spots were available on top of the usual four.

The German word Landesliga can be pretty literally translated as State League.

The three Landesligas cover the following areas:
Landesliga Bayern-Süd:  Bavarian Swabia and Upper Bavaria
Landesliga Bayern-Mitte: Upper Palatinate, Middle Franconia and Lower Bavaria
Landesliga Bayern-Nord: Lower Franconia and Upper Franconia

From 1988 to 2012 the seven Bezirksoberligas were set below the Landesligas, covering the above-mentioned seven Bezirke. The winners of those gained promotion, the runners-up faced a promotion play-off for a number of promotion spot which vary from season to season. Previous to that, the Bezirksligas were set below the Landesligas, with the slight fluctuations in the number of leagues.

Only four teams in Bavaria have never dropped down to Landesliga level, these being FC Bayern Munich, TSV 1860 Munich, 1. FC Nürnberg and FC Augsburg, with the SpVgg Fürth, now SpVgg Greuther Fürth, being by far the most prominent club to have played in any of the three Landesligas, having three German championships to their name (1914, 1926, 1929).

Since 1980, the reserve teams of Landesliga clubs are permitted to enter the league system. Previous to that, they had to compete in separate reserve leagues, with only teams in the Bayernliga and above being permitted to enter their reserve teams in league football.

Landesligas since 2012

The Bavarian football federation decided on drastic changes to the league system from 2012 onwards. With the introduction of the Regionalliga Bayern from 2012 to 2013, it placed two Bayernligas, north and south, below the new league as the new fifth tier of the German league system. Below those, five Landesligas instead of the existing three were set, which would be geographically divided to limit travel and increase the number of local derbies.

The five new leagues were:
 Landesliga Bayern-Nordost
 Landesliga Bayern-Nordwest
 Landesliga Bayern-Mitte
 Landesliga Bayern-Südost
 Landesliga Bayern-Südwest

The clubs in these leagues were made up from Landesliga clubs who failed to qualify for the Bayernliga, a set number of Bezirksoberliga clubs and, through a promotion round, the Bezirksliga champions.

League champions

Landesliga Bayern: 1945 to 1950

Landesligas from 1963 to 2012

Five divisions: since 2012

Source:

References

Sources
 Die Bayernliga 1945 - 1997 . DSFS. 1998
 Deutschlands Fußball in Zahlen,  An annual publication with tables and results from the Bundesliga to Verbandsliga/Landesliga. DSFS.
 Kicker Almanach,  The yearbook on German football from Bundesliga to Oberliga, since 1937. Kicker Sports Magazine.
 Süddeutschlands Fußballgeschichte in Tabellenform 1897-1988  History of Southern German football in tables, by Ludolf Hyll.
 50 Jahre Bayerischer Fußball-Verband  50-year-anniversary book of the Bavarian FA. Vindelica Verlag. 1996

External links 
  Bayerischer Fußball-Verband (Bavarian FA)
  Das deutsche Fußball Archiv  Historic German league tables
  Bavarian League tables and results
  Website with tables and results from the Bavarian Oberliga to Bezirksliga

  

  
 

  
  

 
Bayern
3
1945 establishments in Germany
1950 disestablishments in Germany
1963 establishments in West Germany
Sports leagues established in 1963